Sri Sarada Residential School (also called SSRS) was the first English medium school in both East and West Godavari districts of Andhra Pradesh.

The school was run until 1997, and was then restarted in 2001 with the name of Murthyraju Residential School, and was merged into the Sasi Merit School in 2005.

References

1983 establishments in Andhra Pradesh
Educational institutions established in 1983
Educational institutions disestablished in 2005
Schools in West Godavari district